Candy66 is an alternative metal band from Venezuela formed in Caracas in 1998. This band's breakthrough across the country began in 2000 when they won the first place at the Festival Nuevas Bandas, a musical contest that features newborn bands of different genres from all over the country. They have quoted many bands as their influences, such as Black Sabbath, Faith No More, Pantera, Nirvana, among others.

The band have released four studio albums, P.O.P. (Para Otras Personas) (For Other People - in English translation) in 2001, A+ in 2003, Evolutio released in 2009 and Nueva Guerra (New War - in English translation) in 2013. They also released a live album 5 Mundos (5 Worlds) in 2004.

They released several singles after 2015 such as Sombras en el Sol (2015), Estelar (2019), and Hijos del Abismo (2019). In 2020, the band released a special video clip with a recognized Venezuelan rapper named NK Profeta, an acoustic version of their song "Invisible".

Members 
Jean Carlo De Oliveira (guitar and lead vocals)
Jose A. Morantes (guitar)

Ray Díaz (bass guitar)
Gustavo Morantes (drums)
Let Arteaga (DJ and backing vocals)

Discography 

P.O.P. (2001)
A+ (2003)
5 Mundos (2004) (Spanish for "5 Worlds")
Evolutio (2009)
Nueva Guerra (2013) (Spanish for "New War")

External links 
Official Page

Venezuelan musical groups
Musical groups established in 1998
Alternative metal musical groups
Musical quintets